Gheorghe Rășinaru (born 10 February 1915-death in 1994) was a Romanian football midfielder who played for Romania in the 1938 FIFA World Cup. He spent most of his career playing for Rapid București.

Honours
Rapid București
Cupa României (6): 1936–37, 1937–38, 1938–39, 1939–40, 1940–41, 1941–42

References

External links

1915 births
1994 deaths
People from Sebeș
People from the Kingdom of Hungary
Romanian footballers
Romania international footballers
Association football midfielders
Liga I players
Liga II players
CFR Cluj players
FC Rapid București players
1938 FIFA World Cup players